Spatalla barbigera, the fine-leaf spoon, is a flower-bearing shrub that belongs to the genus Spatalla and forms part of the fynbos. The plant is native to the Western Cape, South Africa.

Description 
The plant dies after a fire but the seeds survive. The plant is bisexual and pollinated by insects. Two months after the plant has flowered, the ripe seeds fall to the ground where they are spread by ants.

Distribution and habitat 
The plant is found in the eastern Langeberg, Outeniqua Mountains, and central Swartberg.

References

External links
Threatened Species Programme | SANBI Red List of South African Plants
Spatalla barbigera (Fine-leaf spoon)
Fine-leaf Unispoon
Spatalla barbigera Salisb. ex Kn. 1809 bl. 78

barbigera